The Women's Franchise League was a British organisation created by the suffragette Emmeline Pankhurst together with her husband Richard and others in 1889, fourteen years before the creation of the Women's Social and Political Union in 1903. The President of the organisation in 1889 was Harriet McIlquham. In 1895 the committee who met in Aberystwyth were Ursula Mellor Bright, Mrs Behrens, Esther? Bright, Herbert Burrows, Dr Clark MP, Mrs Hunter of Matlock Bank, Jane Brownlow, Mrs E. James (who lived locally), H.N.Mozley, Alice Cliff Scatcherd, Countess Gertrude Guillaume-Schack, Jane Cobden Unwin and Dr and Mrs Pankhurst.

The organization's main achievement was to secure the vote for some married women in local elections after the campaigning of its members, whereas up to the 1894 Local Government Act voting in municipal elections was only available to some single women.

The league broke up in 1903, five years after the death of Richard.

See also
 List of suffragists and suffragettes
 List of women's rights activists
 Timeline of women's suffrage
 Women's suffrage in the United Kingdom
 Women's suffrage organizations

References

Women's suffrage in the United Kingdom
1889 establishments in the United Kingdom
Emmeline Pankhurst
Suffrage organisations in the United Kingdom